The Bottle River is a river that forms part of the Canada–United States border between Minnesota and Ontario.

See also
List of rivers of Minnesota

References

Minnesota Watersheds
USGS Hydrologic Unit Map - State of Minnesota (1974)

Rivers of Minnesota
Rivers of Rainy River District
International rivers of North America